The Glorious Fourth is a 1927 American short silent comedy film directed by Robert F. McGowan. It was the 62nd Our Gang short subject released.

Cast

The Gang
 Joe Cobb - Joe
 Jackie Condon - Jackie
 Allen Hoskins - Farina
 Jannie Hoskins - Mango
 Jay R. Smith - Jay
 Harry Spear - Harry
 Pete the Pup - Pansy

Additional cast
 Jack Hanlon as Boy with quarter
 Harry Arras - Local resident
 Charles A. Bachman - Officer
 Harry Bowen as Pedestrian
 Charley Chase - Top Hat inebriate
 William Courtright - Cement worker
 June Gittleson as Joe's mother
 Al Hallett - Local resident
 Jack Hill - Man with monocle
 Charles Meakin - Local resident
 Arthur Millett - Local resident
 William A. Orlamond as Scientist
 Dorothy Vernon - Friend of Joe's mother

See also
 Our Gang filmography

References

External links

1927 films
1927 comedy films
1927 short films
American silent short films
American black-and-white films
Films directed by Robert F. McGowan
Hal Roach Studios short films
Our Gang films
Independence Day (United States) films
1920s American films
Silent American comedy films